The first Serbian telenovela is Jelena (2004–2005)

List

References

Categories 
Serbian television series
Lists of telenovelas
Television shows set in Serbia
Television shows filmed in Serbia